The Crafton Hills College Solar Farm is a 1.61 MWp (1.30 MWAC) concentrator photovoltaics (CPV) power station in Yucaipa, California.

It was built by Rosendin Electric using 140 dual-axis SF-1100S systems, each of which contains 28 SF-1100 modules.  

Each module contains reflective optics to concentrate sunlight 650 times onto multi-junction solar cells, allowing a greater efficiency than other photovoltaic power plants.

The farm was constructed under California Solar Initiative (CSI) incentives and the projected annual output of 2.7 GW·h partially satisfies electricity consumption at the college.

Electricity production

See also
 Victor Valley College Solar Farm
 Alamosa Solar Generating Project
 List of photovoltaic power stations
 Renewable energy in the United States
 Renewable portfolio standard
 Solar power in the United States

References

External links
 VIDEO: Crafton Hills College Solar Farm Aerial Footage
 Analysis of energy production at a 1 MW CPV site in southern California
 Analysis Of Soiling Rates At The Victor Valley Community College CPV Site
 Experience from reliability field trails

Solar power stations in California
Yucaipa, California
Photovoltaic power stations in the United States